George John Seabury (November 10, 1844 – February 13, 1909) was an American chemist and pharmacist. In 1874 he and Robert Wood Johnson invented a new type of adhesive bandage.

He died at his home in New York on February 15, 1909. He is buried in Orange, New Jersey's Rosedale Cemetery.

Works 
 Shall Pharmacists Become Tradesmen (1899)
 The Constructive and Reconstructive Forces Essential to Maintain American International Supremacy (1902)

References 

1844 births
1909 deaths
Scientists from New York City
Johnson & Johnson people
Businesspeople in the pharmaceutical industry
19th-century American chemists
New York (state) Republicans
Burials at Rosedale Cemetery (Orange, New Jersey)
1908 United States presidential electors